Edward John Nanson (13 December 1850 – 1 July 1936) was a mathematician known for devising Nanson's method, a Condorcet-compliant variation of the Borda count using successive elimination to find a winner.

He was born in England and received his professional education at Trinity College from 1870 to 1874.  In 1875, he was appointed Professor of Mathematics at the University of Melbourne, in the state of Victoria, Australia where he immigrated.  Nanson was an election reformer and office bearer of the Proportional Representation League of Victoria who produced several booklets on election methods. He retired from his lifetime appointment in 1922. At the time of his death, he was survived by ten children from two marriages.  The Professor Nanson Prize was named in his honour, which is annually awarded to students for outstanding achievements in pure and applied mathematics.

Footnotes 
 "Methods of Election"  Transactions and Proceedings of the Royal Society of Victoria, vol. 18; 1882; pages 197–240; #954.

External links
 
Australian electoral reform and two concepts of representation An article discussing Nanson's work by Iain McLean.
Proportional Representation Text of pamphlet by Nanson.
Professor E. J. Nanson's death National Library of Australia's digitised Australian Newspaper article

1850 births
1936 deaths
Mathematicians from Melbourne
British emigrants to colonial Australia
Alumni of Trinity College, Cambridge
Academic staff of the University of Melbourne